Apiomerus flaviventris, a bee assassin bug, is an insect that feeds on bees. It is found in arid and semiarid southwestern North America.  This bee assassin is known to extract plant resins and apply them as defensive chemicals to its eggs, protecting the eggs from predation, especially by ants, but possibly also other species. Females of A. flaviventris collect resin from brittlebush, Encelia farinosa Gray ex Torr. (Asteraceae).

References

Use of Plant Resin by a Bee Assassin Bug, Apiomerus flaviventris (Hemiptera: Reduviidae). Annals of the Entomological Society of America 100(2):320-326. 2007

flaviventris
Hemiptera of North America
Insects described in 1846